Royal Terence Ivey (born December 20, 1981) is an American professional basketball coach and former player who is an assistant coach for the Brooklyn Nets of the National Basketball Association (NBA). He is also the head coach of the South Sudanese national basketball team. He played college basketball for the Texas Longhorns before spending 10 years in the NBA.

Early life and college
Ivey was born in Harlem in the Manhattan borough of New York City and started on the basketball team of Benjamin N. Cardozo High School, leading the team to its first PSAL championship. He attended Blair Academy for a post-graduate year.

Ivey played college basketball at the University of Texas at Austin, in which he finished as the school's all-time career leader in games started (126).

Professional career
Ivey was selected with the 37th overall pick in the 2004 NBA draft by the Atlanta Hawks.

On September 18, 2007, Ivey signed a one-year contract with the Bucks.

On July 24, 2008, Ivey agreed to terms with the Philadelphia 76ers.

On June 15, 2009, Philadelphia announced that Ivey declined the player option on his contract for the 2009–10 season, making him an unrestricted free agent. However, he re-signed with the 76ers in August 2009.

On February 18, 2010, Ivey was traded to the Milwaukee Bucks along with Primoz Brezec in exchange for Jodie Meeks and Francisco Elson.

On July 21, 2010, Ivey signed with the Oklahoma City Thunder. He reached the NBA Finals with the Thunder in 2012, but the team lost to the Miami Heat.

On July 27, 2012, Ivey returned to the 76ers.

On September 30, 2013, he signed with the Atlanta Hawks. However, he was waived on October 25.

On January 16, 2014, he signed a 10-day contract with the Oklahoma City Thunder. On January 26, 2014, his 10-day contract expired and the Thunder chose not to offer him a second 10-day contract.

On January 29, 2014, he signed with the Guangdong Southern Tigers of China for rest of the 2013–14 season.

Coaching career
On September 29, 2014, Ivey was named an assistant coach for the Oklahoma City Blue of the NBA Development League for the 2014–15 season, effectively ending his 10-year playing career.

On July 1, 2016, Ivey was elevated from a player development assistant with the Blue to an assistant coach with the Oklahoma City Thunder.

On June 7, 2018, Ivey joined the New York Knicks as an assistant coach to David Fizdale. Ivey remained with the Knicks after Fizdale's firing and served under interim head coach Mike Miller.

On November 11, 2020, the Brooklyn Nets hired Ivey as an assistant coach under Steve Nash.

He coached the team at AfroBasket 2021, the country's first major tournament. Ivey and South Sudan reached the quarterfinals where the team was eliminated by defending champions Tunisia.

Personal life
During the 2011 NBA lockout, Ivey returned to the University of Texas to finish his degree in applied learning and development.

NBA career statistics

Regular season

|-
| style="text-align:left;"|
| style="text-align:left;"|Atlanta
| 62 || 5 || 13.0 || .429 || .333 || .701 || 1.4 || 1.7 || .6 || .1 || 3.5
|-
| style="text-align:left;"|
| style="text-align:left;"|Atlanta
| 73 || 66 || 13.4 || .439 || .400 || .727 || 1.3 || 1.0 || .3 || .1 || 3.6
|-
| style="text-align:left;"|
| style="text-align:left;"|Atlanta
| 53 || 18 || 10.2 || .448 || .313 || .686 || 1.0 || .8 || .5 || .1 || 3.0
|-
| style="text-align:left;"|
| style="text-align:left;"|Milwaukee
| 75 || 20 || 19.2 || .394 || .327 || .726 || 1.6 || 2.1 || .6 || .1 || 5.6
|-
| style="text-align:left;"|
| style="text-align:left;"|Philadelphia
| 71 || 0 || 12.1 || .332 || .342 || .791 || 1.1 || .6 || .5 || .1 || 3.0
|-
| style="text-align:left;"|
| style="text-align:left;"|Philadelphia
| 26 || 0 || 9.1 || .473 || .500 || .857 || 1.0 || .7 || .4 || .1 || 2.7
|-
| style="text-align:left;"|
| style="text-align:left;"|Milwaukee
| 18 || 0 || 5.0 || .321 || .182 || .600 || .4 || .6 || .5 || .0 || 1.3
|-
| style="text-align:left;"|
| style="text-align:left;"|Oklahoma City
| 25 || 0 || 6.2 || .421 || .438 || 1.000 || .6 || .3 || .2 || .0 || 1.6
|-
| style="text-align:left;"|
| style="text-align:left;"|Oklahoma City
| 34 || 0 || 10.4 || .356 || .340 || .125 || .7 || .3 || .4 || .0 || 2.1
|-
| style="text-align:left;"|
| style="text-align:left;"|Philadelphia
| 53 || 5 || 13.2 || .431 || .420 || .563 || 1.1 || .6 || .4 || .1 || 3.2
|-
| style="text-align:left;"|
| style="text-align:left;"|Oklahoma City
| 2 || 0 || 2.5 || .000 || .000 || .000 || .5 || .0 || .0 || .0 || .0
|- class="sortbottom"
| style="text-align:center;" colspan="2"|Career
| 492 || 114 || 12.5 || .406 || .361 || .706 || 1.1 || 1.0 || .5 || .1 || 3.3

Playoffs

|-
| style="text-align:left;"|2009
| style="text-align:left;"|Philadelphia
| 6 || 0 || 7.5 || .273 || .286 || .750 || .7 || .0 || .5 || .0 || 1.8
|-
| style="text-align:left;"|2010
| style="text-align:left;"|Milwaukee
| 3 || 0 || 3.7 || .333 || .000 || .000 || .0 || .7 || .0 || .3 || 1.3
|-
| style="text-align:left;"|2011
| style="text-align:left;"|Oklahoma City
| 2 || 0 || 3.0 || 1.000 || 1.000 || .000 || .5 || .5 || .0 || .0 || 3.0
|-
| style="text-align:left;"|2012
| style="text-align:left;"|Oklahoma City
| 5 || 0 || 4.2 || .364 || .400 || .500 || .6 || .2 || .4 || .0 || 2.2
|- class="sortbottom"
| style="text-align:center;" colspan="2"|Career
| 16 || 0 || 5.1 || .367 || .375 || .667 || .5 || .3 || .3 || .1 || 2.0

References

External links

 Royal Ivey at texassports.com

1981 births
Living people
21st-century African-American sportspeople
African-American basketball coaches
African-American basketball players
American men's basketball players
Atlanta Hawks draft picks
Atlanta Hawks players
Basketball coaches from New York (state)
Basketball players from New York City
Benjamin N. Cardozo High School alumni
Blair Academy alumni
Guangdong Southern Tigers players
Milwaukee Bucks players
New York Knicks assistant coaches
Oklahoma City Blue coaches
Oklahoma City Thunder players
Oklahoma City Thunder assistant coaches
Philadelphia 76ers players
Shooting guards
Small forwards
Sportspeople from Manhattan
Sportspeople from Queens, New York
Texas Longhorns men's basketball players